A general election was held in the Northern Territory on Saturday August 30, 1997, and was won by the incumbent Country Liberal Party (CLP).

Shane Stone continued as Chief Minister.

During the previous term, the CLP had lost the seat of Fannie Bay to Labor in a by-election. The CLP did not win the seat back, but managed to take MacDonnell from Labor and Nelson from Independent Noel Padgham-Purich.

Retiring MPs

Labor
Neil Bell MLA (MacDonnell)

Country Liberal
Fred Finch MLA (Leanyer)
Rick Setter MLA (Jingili)

Independent
Noel Padgham-Purich MLA (Nelson)

Results 

|}

Candidates

Sitting members are listed in bold. Successful candidates are highlighted in the relevant colour.

Seats changing hands

Post-election pendulum 
The following pendulum is known as the Mackerras pendulum, invented by psephologist Malcolm Mackerras.  The pendulum works by lining up all of the seats held in the Legislative Assembly according to the percentage point margin they are held by on a two-party-preferred basis. This is also known as the swing required for the seat to change hands. Given a uniform swing to the opposition or government parties, the number of seats that change hands can be predicted.

References

Psephos - Adam Carr's Election Archive

1997 elections in Australia
Elections in the Northern Territory
1990s in the Northern Territory
August 1997 events in Australia